Mary Tillinghast was a British cook and writer best known for her work Rare and Excellent Receipts by Mary Tillinghast (1690).

References

English food writers
English chefs
Year of death unknown
Year of birth unknown